La traición (English title:The betrayal) is a Mexican telenovela produced by Ernesto Alonso and directed by Raúl Araiza for Televisa in 1984.

Helena Rojo, Jorge Vargas and Gonzalo Vega starred as protagonists, while Sergio Jiménez and Susana Alexander starred as antagonists.

"The Best Telenovela of the Year" (Premios TVyNovelas 1985)

Cast 

Helena Rojo as Antonia Guerra
Jorge Vargas as Rafael del Valle
Sergio Jiménez as Arturo Serrano
Gonzalo Vega as Franco Visconti
Susana Alexander as Estela Serrano de del Valle
Emilio Fernández as Gral. Arcadio Carvajal
Manuel Ojeda as Pech Gutiérrez
Gina Romand as Margarita
José Carlos Ruiz as Cholo
Gabriela Ruffo as Alicia
Rebecca Jones as Georgina Guerra
Alejandro Camacho as Absalón
Julieta Rosen as Julia
Patricia Reyes Spíndola as Lázara
Guillermo Aguilar as Gastón
Nelson Millán as Eduardo del Valle
Yolanda Ciani as Roberta
Raúl Araiza as Cristóbal Guerra
Roxana Chávez as Dalia
Ofelia Cano as Gilda
Fernando Ciangherotti as Mauricio
Jerardo as Germán
María Prado as María
Jorge Ordaz as Laplace
Ricardo Rivero as Journalist
Luis Xavier
José Zambrano as Police chief
Javier Ruán as Rogelio
José D'Alvarado as Rendón
Marco Muñoz as Rodrigo Ruiz
Aldo Pastur as Lawyer
Lucy Tovar
Blanca Torres as Rosario
Teresa Velázquez
Alejandro Ruiz

Awards

References

External links

Mexican telenovelas
1984 telenovelas
1984 Mexican television series debuts
1985 Mexican television series endings
Televisa telenovelas
Spanish-language telenovelas